Thomas Dallam (1575 - after 1620) was an English organ-builder.  
Dallam served an apprenticeship and became a member of London's Blacksmiths' Company. He travelled frequently to build organs on site, going as far as Turkey.

Family
Dallam was baptised in Flixton, Lancashire.  His family came from Dallam, near Warrington.  
A number of his descendants were also organ-builders.

Organs

During 1599 and 1600 Dallam went on a voyage from London to Constantinople in order to deliver an organ to the sultan Mehmet III. 
The instrument was commissioned as a present from Queen Elizabeth I and could be played normally or by clockwork. 
On arrival, the organ took many weeks to assemble. Dallam kept a diary of his journey, which was published in the nineteenth century by the Hakluyt Society.

Dallam afterwards built many important organs, including that of King's College Chapel, Cambridge. In 1616 he supplied an organ for the Chapel Royal at Holyrood Palace.  Unfortunately, much of his work was destroyed by people hostile to church organs following the outbreak of the English Civil War.  In the case of King's College Chapel, the existing instrument is the product of successive rebuilds, and it is not known for certain whether it contains any of Dallam's work, but it is believed that some of the case is his.

References

External links

Encyclopædia Britannica profile
 
 

People from Flixton, Greater Manchester
16th-century English people
British blacksmiths
British pipe organ builders
British travel writers
Year of birth uncertain
Year of death uncertain
17th-century English people
17th-century diarists